"Groovy Train" was the second single released by Liverpool-based group The Farm. It was released in 1990 as the first single from their debut album Spartacus (which would be in 1991), having been produced by Graham "Suggs" McPherson of Madness and Terry Farley. The single reached no. 6 on the UK Singles Chart, no. 41 on the US Billboard Hot 100, and no. 15 on the US Billboard Modern Rock Tracks chart.

It contains a distinctive guitar intro by Keith Mullin which was possibly his most significant contribution to any one song. "Groovy Train" featured on the influential 1990 Madchester compilation album Happy Daze.

The video for the single was filmed at Pleasureland Southport and features a cameo from actor Bill Dean, who at the time was in Liverpool soap opera Brookside. His character, Harry Cross was a retired train driver, and Dean is seen in the video driving a train with the band aboard.

Charts

References

External links
Lyrics
Cover art
Video for "Groovy Train"

1990 singles
1990 songs
The Farm (British band) songs
Songs written by Peter Hooton
Songs written by Steve Grimes
Songs about trains